Stephen Marks was an Oxford college head in the 16th century.

Marks was  educated at Exeter College, Oxford, graduating B.A. in 1552, M.A. in 1554, and D.D. in 1559. He became a Fellow of Exeter in 1549; and its rector from 1556 to 1560.

References

Alumni of Exeter College, Oxford
Rectors of Exeter College, Oxford
16th-century English people